In a Shallow Grave is a 1988 American romantic drama film written and directed by Kenneth Bowser and starring Michael Biehn and Patrick Dempsey.  It is based on James Purdy's 1976 novel of the same name.

Cast
Michael Biehn as Garnet Montrose
Maureen Mueller as Georgina Rance
Patrick Dempsey as Potter Daventry
Michael Beach as Quintus Pearch
Thomas B. Mason as Edgar Doust
Mike Pettinger as Milkman
Prentiss Rowe as Postman
Ron Rosenthal as Army Doctor
Muriel Moore as Mrs. Gondess

References

External links
 
 

American romantic drama films
Films based on American novels
Films directed by Kenneth Bowser
1980s English-language films
1980s American films